Michael Steinberg (born 15 May 1959) is a director, writer and producer. He is a graduate of the UCLA School of Theater, Film and Television. He has directed three films that all premiered at the Sundance Film Festival and has written and/or produced four other award-winning features since his debut in 1992. In addition, Steinberg has written, directed, and/or produced several television projects since 2000.

Selected filmography

References

External links

https://michaelsteinbergfilms.com

1959 births
Living people
American film directors
American film producers
American male screenwriters
Screenwriters from South Dakota